Paesia is a genus of large, coarse ferns in the family Dennstaedtiaceae described as a genus in 1833. Species are known from South America, Central America, East Asia, and New Caledonia.

accepted species
 Paesia acclivis (Kunze) Kuhn - Venezuela, Colombia, Ecuador, Peru 
 Paesia amazonica (Christ) C. Chr. - Loreto Region in Peru 
 Paesia anfractuosa (Christ) C. Chr. - Panama, Costa Rica 
 Paesia glandulosa (Sw.) Kuhn - Panama, Costa Rica, Venezuela, Colombia, Ecuador, Peru, Bolivia 
 Paesia rugulosa (Labill.) Kuhn - Vietnam, New Caledonia 
 Paesia scalaris (Mett.) Kuhn 
 Paesia taiwanensis W.C. Shieh - Taiwan

unresolved species include
 Paesia scaberula Kuhn

References 

Dennstaedtiaceae
Fern genera